The Student is a 2011 Argentine drama film written and directed by Santiago Mitre.

Cast
 Esteban Lamothe as Roque
 Romina Paula as Paula
 Ricardo Felix as Alberto Acevedo
 Valeria Correa as Valeria

References

External links
 

2011 films
2011 drama films
Argentine drama films
2010s Spanish-language films
2010s Argentine films